The Randolph–Macon Yellow Jackets football team represents Randolph–Macon College in the sport of American football. In 1969 Randolph–Macon defeated the University of Bridgeport (Connecticut) 47–28 in the inaugural Knute Rockne Bowl laying claim to a shared College Division III National Championship with Wittenberg University (Springfield, Ohio) which had defeated William Jewell College in the first Amos Alonzo Stagg Bowl. The 4 teams had been chosen by the NCAA to compete in the first ever playoffs established for Division II schools. No complete playoff was set up until 1973. The 1969 football team was inducted into the college's Hall of Fame in 2004. The Yellow Jacket football team is currently coached by Pedro Arruza and won the ODAC championship in 2008. As of Nov 2013 the football team had posted a record 7 seasons with a winning record under Coach Arruza. The football team plays its home games at Day Field.

History
Randolph-Macon has a rich football history dating back to 1881.  Randolph-Macon was also a founding member of the Eastern Virginia Intercollegiate Athletic Association (originally just the Virginia Intercollegiate Athletic Association) in 1900, and remained full member of the association until the organization's demise in 1921.

On November 24, 2020, the 1984 football victory over Hampden Sydney was voted the greatest football game in the history of Randolph Macon dating back to 1891. In this game, Randolph Macon’s defense forced five turnovers which allowed the explosive and record breaking offense to score 31 points in a 31-10 victory. This win allowed Randolph Macon to advance to the NCAA playoffs for the first time in the school’s history finishing the regular season ranked #5 in the nation and #1 in the NCAA South Region.       During the historic 1984 season, Randolph Macon wide receiver Keith Gilliam broke the all time NCAA record by having nine consecutive receptions for touchdowns.

Playoffs

References

 
1881 establishments in Virginia
American football teams established in 1881